Parmanand Rishideo (born 12 January 1962) is an Indian politician. He is a member of the Bihar Legislative Assembly, and currently represents Raniganj. He exposed the Mahadalit Land Scam when he raised the issue on the floor of the Bihar Legislative Assembly.

References 

Bihar MLAs 2010–2015
Bharatiya Janata Party politicians from Bihar
People from Araria
1962 births
Living people